Yūsuke Kobayashi (born 12 August 1993) is a Japanese judoka.

He is the silver medallist of the 2017 Judo Grand Slam Tokyo in the -90 kg category.

References

External links
 

1993 births
Living people
Japanese male judoka
Judoka at the 2018 Asian Games
Asian Games gold medalists for Japan
Asian Games medalists in judo
Medalists at the 2018 Asian Games
20th-century Japanese people
21st-century Japanese people